Keskpäevatund ("The Midday Hour") is a weekly radio programme of political analysis which has been broadcast by Radio Kuku in Estonia since 16 May 1992.

It's hosted by anchorman  with the companions Rein Kilk and Ainar Ruussaar. Sometimes the show is also visited by Meelis Atonen, Marek Strandberg, Hans H. Luik and other well-known opinion leaders.

Previous commentators on the show include Kersti Kaljulaid, the current President of Estonia.

References

External links
  Web audio archive, contains recordings since late 2001.
  Recording of the first edition.

Estonian radio programs
News radio programs
1992 radio programme debuts